Juan Alfonso de la Puente Bordonaba (born 14 January 1956 in Gijón) is a former Spanish handball player who competed at the 1980, the 1984 and the 1988 Summer Olympics for his native country.

In 1980 he was part of the Spanish team which finished fifth in the Olympic Tournament. He played all six matches and scored ten goals.

Four years later he finished eighth with the Spanish team in the 1984 Olympic tournament. He played four matches and scored five goals.

In 1988 he was a member of the Spanish team which finished ninth in the Olympic tournament. He played five matches and scored seven goals.

References

1956 births
Living people
Sportspeople from Gijón
Spanish male handball players
Olympic handball players of Spain
Handball players at the 1980 Summer Olympics
Handball players at the 1984 Summer Olympics
Handball players at the 1988 Summer Olympics
Real Grupo de Cultura Covadonga sportsmen